Theo Selemidis (born 27 October 1959) is an Australian former soccer player who played at both professional and international levels as a midfielder.

Career
Selemidis played at club level for Heidelberg United and Melbourne Croatia.

He also earned seven caps for Australia in 1980. Selemidis scored his only international goal in a 3–3 tie against Greece on 11 November 1980.

References

1959 births
Living people
Australian soccer players
Australia international soccer players
Australia B international soccer players
Australian people of Greek descent
Association football midfielders
1980 Oceania Cup players